Lhospitalet is a commune in the Lot department in south-western France.

Geography
The Barguelonne forms part of the commune's southern border.

See also
Communes of the Lot department

References

Communes of Lot (department)
Lot communes articles needing translation from French Wikipedia